The genus Euobrimus is a Philippines-native stick insect genus that is very similar or synonymous with the genus Brasidas.

Description 

The representatives of this genus correspond to typical Obrimini in habit and resemble Obrimus species in appearance. A pair of very conspicuous holes or pits in the metasternum is characteristic of this genus. Similar metasternal pits are otherwise found only in representatives of the genus Brasidas. In egg-laying adult females, the abdomen is markedly thickened in height and width in the middle and ends in a secondary ovipositor for laying eggs. It is ventral formed from the eighth sternite, here named subgenital plate or operculum and dorsally from the eleventh tergum, which is referred to here as the supraanal plate or epiproct.

The eggs are laid in the ground by the female with the ovipositor. Due to this structure, Euobrimus eggs, like Brasidas eggs, have a clearly recognizable opercular angle.

Distribution area 

For most species of the genus, the distribution area is only known through the often general indication of the type locality mentioned in the first description. Representatives of Euobrimus are mentioned from Mindanao in the region around Mount Apo and from the provinces of Surigao del Norte and Surigao del Sur, as well as from the offshore island of Siargao. On Luzon, the genus is found in the south-eastern province of Sorsogon, more precisely on Mount Pulog (not to be confused with Mount Pulag in northern Luzon), and on the offshore island of Rapu Rapu. There are also two valid species whose locality is given as Samar.

Taxonomy 

In 1939 James Abram Garfield Rehn and his son John William Holman Rehn published an extensive work in which, among other genus, they established the genus Euobrimus. In this they placed two already known species that had previously been included in the genus Obrimus. They also described five new Euobrimus species, partly using juvenile type material. Euobrimus atherura, newly described on the basis of a juvenile male, was defined as the type species.
The species described so far are:
 Euobrimus atherura Rehn & Rehn, 1939
 Euobrimus bakeri Rehn & Rehn, 1939
 Euobrimus cavernosus (Stål, 1877)
 Euobrimus cleggi Rehn & Rehn, 1939
 Euobrimus dohrni Rehn & Rehn, 1939
 Euobrimus hoplites Rehn & Rehn, 1939
 Euobrimus lacerta (Redtenbacher, 1906)
 Euobrimus stephenreyesi Lit & Eusebio, 2006

The genus Brasidas, also described by Rehn and Rehn in 1939, is very similar to Euobrimus. A common autapomorphic feature is the metasternal holes or pits. While these are described as semi-bordered (“semicingulate”) in the representatives of the genus Brasidas, they are said to be more completely bordered in Euobrimus. This differentiation does not apply to the current genus assignment of the species currently held. As early as 2004, Oliver Zompro mentioned the need to conduct species-level studies to confirm the status of the genus Euobrimus or to synonymize the genus with Brasidas. Frank H. Hennemann et al. point out in 2016 that both genera are probably synonymous with each other. This assumption was supported by genetic analysis-based study by Sarah Bank et al. to clarify the phylogeny of Heteropterygidae, published in 2021. Although the examined Euobrimus and Brasidas species were found in a common clade, there are no separate clades that would justify the existence of two genera. The genus Obrimus is placed as a sister genus to the common clade of Euobrimus and Brasidas. Furthermore, according to this work, Euobrimus dohrni described by Rehn and Rehn would be a synonym of Brasidas foveolatus.

In terraristics 
According to current opinion, the genus is only represented by one representative in the terrariums of enthusiasts. This species was collected in October 2011 by the French Thierry Heitzmann, who lives in the Philippines, on the island of Rapu-Rapu and initially classified as Brasidas sp. 'Rapu-Rapu'. According to recent research by Sarah Bank et al. this breeding stock is Euobrimus cavernosus. The same applies to a breeding line that was also collected by Heitzmann on Luzon in the province of Sorsogon at Mount Pulog before the summer of 2011. The animals were first identified by Joachim Bresseel as Euobrimus lacerta. According to the study by Bank et al., in which Bresseel also participated, this stock is also Euobrimus cavernosus. While the former stock received the PSG number 362 from the Phasmid Study Group and was still named Brasidas sp. 'Rapu-Rapu', the other stock was given the PSG number 377 and is still referred to there as Euobrimus lacerta.

References

External links

Phasmatodea
Phasmatodea of Asia
Insects described in 1939